NH 127 may refer to:

 National Highway 127 (India)
 New Hampshire Route 127, United States